The A. H. Allyn House is a historic house located at 511 East Walworth Avenue in Delavan, Wisconsin. It was added to the National Register of Historic Places in 1985.

History
Constructed in 1885 in the Queen Anne style, the 3-story house was originally built for Alexander Allyn and his family. It would later serve as a nursing home and furniture store before being bought by Joe Johnson and Ron Markwell in 1984.

References

Houses completed in 1885
Houses in Walworth County, Wisconsin
Houses on the National Register of Historic Places in Wisconsin
Queen Anne architecture in Wisconsin
National Register of Historic Places in Walworth County, Wisconsin
Delavan, Wisconsin